Tom Brown's Schooldays is a 1951 British drama film, produced by Brian Desmond Hurst, directed by Gordon Parry and starring John Howard Davies, Robert Newton and James Hayter. It is based on the 1857 novel of the same name by Thomas Hughes. For this version, Rugby School was used as a filming location.

Cast

Critical reception
"Isn't quite as good as the 1940 Hollywood adaptation," thought Allmovie; whereas The New York Times found it "superior in every way to the one made in Hollywood some years back. The quaint customs have an English-cut, at least". Variety applauded the acting of John Howard Davies, Robert Newton and "a standout performance by John Forrest as the sneering, bullying Flashman"; while Time Out approved the  "solidly carpentered third screen version of Thomas Hughes' famous Rugby story - atmospherically shot on location in the old school itself."

References

External links

 Tom Brown's Schooldays at the website dedicated to Brian Desmond Hurst

1951 films
Films directed by Gordon Parry
Films based on Tom Brown's Schooldays
British coming-of-age drama films
Films scored by Richard Addinsell
1950s coming-of-age drama films
1951 drama films
Films shot in Warwickshire
Films with screenplays by Noel Langley
British drama films
British black-and-white films
1950s English-language films
1950s British films